Joe Fitzpatrick (born 29 April 1984) is an Irish hurler who plays as a right wing-back for the Laois senior team.

Born in Rathdowney, County Laois, Fitzpatrick first played competitive hurling in his youth. He made his senior debut for Laois during the 2003 National Hurling League. He has gone on to play a key role for Laois for over a decade, and has won one National League (Division 2) medal.

At club level he Fitzpatrick is a five-time championship medallist with Rathdowney–Errill.

Joe is also a Hurley Maker based just outside Rathdowney.

Honours
Rathdowney-Errill
Laois Senior Hurling Championship (5): 2006, 2008, 2010, 2012, 2014

Laois
National Hurling League (Division 2) (1): 2007 (c)
National Hurling League, Division 2A (1): 2013

References

External links
 https://www.fitzhurleys.com/

1984 births
Living people
Rathdowney-Errill hurlers
Laois inter-county hurlers